The siege of Fort Bard (also known as Bard Fort) was a military action that took place during May 1800 during the second Napoleonic Italian campaign and stopped the French military leader Napoleon Bonaparte and his Armée de Reserve with approximately 40,000 men for two weeks. The Bard Fort was commanded by Captain Josef Stockard von Bernkopf with approximately 300 Austrian troops and 100 Piedmontese soldiers.

Prelude 
On 13 May, Napoleon entered the current Italian region of Aosta Valley from the little Swiss town of Bourg-Saint-Pierre. Until 16 May, the French had not engaged the Austro-Piedmontese enemy but as they entered Aosta, there was light fighting against the Austrian army.

The siege
Napoleon's advance began to slow when a force led by generals Dupont and Dufour reached the village of Bard, dominated by a small fort that covered the main routes with the exception of a mule path that was used by Napoleon's advance guard to continue on to Ivrea. On the evening of 20 May, Dupont demanded the surrender of Stockard Von Bernkopf, commander of the Austrian company in the fort, who refused. In the meantime, French engineers widened and filled in the holes in the mule path to allow the rest of the army to continue, with the exception of the artillery. On the night of 21 May the village of Bard was conquered by the French army, which proceeded to surround the fort. On 22 May three Austrian cannons captured after the battle of Châtillon started to fire on the fort, dealing little to no damage. In the morning of May 26, the fort was attacked by 300 grenadiers in order to distract the garrison from a smaller force that tried to cross the Dora river. The defenders killed or wounded more than 200 of the grenadiers. General Dufour died while trying to cross the river on a raft. Napoleon himself was worried by the tenacious resistance of the defenders, and the advance of an enemy army coming from Piedmont. On 27 May, Napoleon ordered a division commanded by Joseph Chabran to besiege the fort, and continued on with the rest of the army, rejoining his advance guard. A regiment of 1,243 riflemen led by 119 officers started to attack the fort, but the hidden French support cannons were too small to do serious damage to the building. The siege until 29 May, where a 12-inch cannon named "cannone di Andreossi" (Andreossi's cannon in Italian) was positioned in the church behind the fort, where it could not be seen by the enemy. On 1 June, the cannon began to fire on the fort, destroying a part of its walls. At the end of the day, Bernkopf surrendered, having lost half of his forces. The Italians were allowed to leave the fort with the honours of war before being made prisoner, as was custom at the time after a besieged force had surrendered.

Aftermath
The Fort, called by Napoleon "vilain castel de Bard" (evil castle of Bard in French) was destroyed completely by Napoleon, only being rebuilt in 1830 by Charles Albert of Savoy. The surprise attack at the Austro-Piedmontese forces on the Po river in Lombardy planned by Napoleon was delayed. Napoleon later took over Piedmont and Lombardy by defeating the Austrians in the Battle of Marengo.

See also 
 War of the Second Coalition
 Napoleonic Italian Campaigns

References 

Fort Bard
Fort Bard
Fort Bard